KOMW (680 AM, "Radio Okanogan 680") is a radio station broadcasting an adult standards music format. Licensed to Omak, Washington, United States, the station is currently owned by North Cascades Broadcasting, Inc. and features programming from Salem Radio Network. This station is a daytimer, signing on at sunrise and signing off at sunset, to protect KNBR in San Francisco, also on 680 kHz.

References

External links
FCC History Cards for KOMW
 

Adult standards radio stations in the United States
Radio stations established in 1962
OMW
1962 establishments in Washington (state)
OMW